Grazia Colombo (born 31 August 1964) is an Italian swimmer. She competed in two events at the 1984 Summer Olympics.

References

External links
 

1964 births
Living people
Italian female swimmers
Olympic swimmers of Italy
Swimmers at the 1984 Summer Olympics
Swimmers from Milan
Mediterranean Games gold medalists for Italy
Mediterranean Games medalists in swimming
Swimmers at the 1983 Mediterranean Games
20th-century Italian women